Orinoeme is a genus of beetles in the family Cerambycidae, containing the following species:

 Orinoeme acutipennis Pascoe, 1867
 Orinoeme biplagiata (Breuning, 1939)
 Orinoeme centurio (Pascoe, 1866)
 Orinoeme chalybeata Pascoe, 1867
 Orinoeme ciliata (Breuning, 1939)
 Orinoeme dunni (Breuning, 1976)
 Orinoeme indistincta (Breuning, 1939)
 Orinoeme kaszabi (Breuning, 1969)
 Orinoeme lineatopunctata (Breuning, 1959)
 Orinoeme lineigera Pascoe, 1867
 Orinoeme lineigeroides (Breuning, 1939)
 Orinoeme loriai (Breuning, 1943)
 Orinoeme maculicollis Aurivillius, 1916
 Orinoeme maxima Heller, 1914
 Orinoeme nigripes (Breuning, 1975)
 Orinoeme obliquata (Breuning, 1939)
 Orinoeme papuana (Breuning, 1939)
 Orinoeme parterufotibialis (Breuning, 1970)
 Orinoeme proxima (Breuning, 1939)
 Orinoeme punctata (Montrouzier, 1855)
 Orinoeme puncticollis Pascoe, 1867
 Orinoeme rosselli (Breuning, 1970)
 Orinoeme rotundipennis (Breuning, 1939)
 Orinoeme rubricollis MacLeay, 1886
 Orinoeme rufipes (Breuning, 1975)
 Orinoeme rufitarsis Pascoe, 1867
 Orinoeme stictica (Breuning, 1948)
 Orinoeme striata Aurivillius, 1916
 Orinoeme sulciceps Gestro, 1876
 Orinoeme surigaonis Heller, 1923
 Orinoeme szekessyi (Breuning, 1953)
 Orinoeme ternatensis (Breuning, 1969)
 Orinoeme tricolor (Breuning, 1959)
 Orinoeme unicoloripennis (Breuning, 1959)
 Orinoeme websteri (Breuning, 1970)
 Orinoeme xanthosticta Gestro, 1876

References

 
Cerambycidae genera